Lu e Cuccaro Monferrato is a comune (municipality) in the province of Alessandria, Piedmont, northern Italy. It was formed on 1 February 2019 by the merger of the previous comuni of Lu and Cuccaro Monferrato.

References

Cities and towns in Piedmont